Nelva Weber (1908–1990) was an American landscape architect and wrote extensively about landscape design. She opened her practice in 1945 in New York, NY. Prior to opening her own landscape architecture practice, she worked on the Palisades Parkway with C.C. Combs. She was also employed by the architecture firm Shaw Maess & Murphy and later as a designer on city parks for the New York City Parks Department.

Life and career
Born in Arrowsmith, Illinois, Weber received her B.A. in English from Illinois Wesleyan University and later a B.F.A. in landscape architecture and a M.A. in plant ecology from University of Illinois in 1935. Post graduation, she moved to New York City where, after several jobs, she worked for the New York City Parks Department before opening her own practice in 1945.

She was a contributor to Landscape Architecture magazine and The New York Times on landscape and horticulture from 1945 through the 1970s. She maintained an active practice, ran workshops and was the author of How to Plan Your Own Home Landscape: How to Organize Your Outdoor Space and How to Utilize It for Maximum Pleasure and Minimum Maintenance All Year Round. There is a book of her landscape plans edited by Ralph Bailey, Landscaping Plans for Small Homes Plans By Nelva M. Weber, Landscape Architect published in 1954.

Weber's daughter is the photography curator Sandra S. Phillips.

Selected works
Campus design for the Illinois Wesleyan University
Campus design for Bard College, New York
Purnell School, New Jersey 
Tree of Life Arboretum at Hancock Shaker Village, Pittsfield, Massachusetts 
First Congregational Church, Litchfield, Connecticut 
Saint Andrew's Episcopal Church St. Francis Memorial Garden, New Providence, New Jersey
Mary Rockefeller estate 
Oscar de la Renta estate

References

External links
Guide to the Nelva Weber Papers, Cornell University Library

1908 births
1990 deaths
American landscape architects
Women landscape architects